Aniva is a coastal town and the administrative center of Anivsky District of Sakhalin Oblast, Russia, located on the coast of Aniva Bay in southern Sakhalin Island on the Lyutoga River,  south of Yuzhno-Sakhalinsk. Population:

History
It was founded in 1886 as the village of Lyutoga. In 1905, it was ceded to Japan with the rest of the southern part of Sakhalin by the Treaty of Portsmouth and renamed  by the Japanese. The village was recaptured by the Soviet Union in 1945; it was granted town status and renamed Aniva in 1946.

The origin of the name of the bay is most likely associated with the Ainu words “en” and “willow”. The first is usually translated as “existing, located”, and the second as “mountain range, rock, peak”; thus, “Aniva” can be translated as “having ridges” or “located among the ridges (mountains)”

Administrative and municipal status
Within the framework of administrative divisions, Aniva serves as the administrative center of Anivsky District and is subordinated to it. As a municipal division, the town of Aniva and fifteen rural localities of Anivsky District are incorporated as Anivsky Urban Okrug.

Economy
The town's economy relies mainly on fishing, particularly salmon.

References

Notes

Sources

External links
Official website of Aniva 
Directory of organizations in Aniva 

Cities and towns in Sakhalin Oblast
Populated coastal places in Russia